Iron City is a prison novel by the American writer Lloyd L. Brown based on an actual court case and inspired by the author's experiences as a labor organizer and political prisoner in Pittsburgh, Pennsylvania from 1936 to 1941.

The novel tells the story of Lonnie James, a black youth falsely convicted of-and sentenced to death for the murder of a white businessman. From inside the "iron city" of the Allegheny County Jail in Pittsburgh, America's "iron city," three black Communist prisoners spearhead a fight to save James's life. Iron City confronts race relations in mid-twentieth-century America inside and outside prison walls and promotes a Communist vision of racial and class solidarity.

References

1951 American novels
Novels set in Pittsburgh
Proletarian literature